Magunkaquog was one of the Christian indigenous praying towns established by the missionary John Eliot near the Massachusetts Bay Colony. Magunkaquog was established in 1660.

References

Further reading

History of New England
Native American history of Massachusetts
Christianization
Assimilation of indigenous peoples of North America
Native American Christianity
Wampanoag